Kathy Kreag Richardson (born April 28, 1956) is an American politician who served as a member of the Indiana House of Representatives for the 29th district from 1993 to 2018.

Career 
In December 2017, Richardson announced that she would not be running for reelection in 2018, but would seek the office of Hamilton County clerk of the Circuit Court. She previously served as clerk of the Indiana Circuit Court from 1984 to 1991.

References

External links
Representative Kathy Kreag Richardson official Indiana State Legislature site
 

1956 births
Living people
Republican Party members of the Indiana House of Representatives
21st-century American politicians